Marcus Leslie Hancock (March 10, 1892 – December 2, 1977) was an English-born horticulturist and politician in Ontario, Canada. He represented Wellington South in the Legislative Assembly of Ontario from 1943 to 1945 as a Co-operative Commonwealth Federation (CCF) member.

The son of Marcus Hancock and Caroline Dunn, he was born in Brabourne, Kent, came to Canada in 1914 and was educated at the Ontario Agricultural College. Hancock worked as a nurseryman, landscape designer and horticulture instructor. He served with the Princess Patricia's Canadian Light Infantry from 1915 to 1919, reaching the rank of lieutenant. From 1923 to 1927, he was a horticulturist at Nanking University in China. In 1924, he married Dorothy Macklin. Hancock was a teacher at the Ontario Agricultural College from 1932 to 1943. During World War II, he was able to help a number of Japanese-Canadians avoid a stay in an internment camp by hiring them to live and work on his garden property.

He was known as a breeder of rhododendrons. In 1972, Hancock founded the Rhododendron Society of Canada. He died of heart failure at the age of 85.

The Leslie Hancock Garden at the Montreal Botanical Garden was named in his honour.

His son was urban planner Macklin Leslie Hancock.

References

External links

1892 births
1977 deaths
Ontario Co-operative Commonwealth Federation MPPs
20th-century Canadian politicians
Canadian horticulturists
British emigrants to Canada
Canadian expatriates in China